Velký Malahov is a municipality and village in Domažlice District in the Plzeň Region of the Czech Republic. It has about 200 inhabitants.

Administrative parts
Villages of Jivjany and Ostromeč are administrative parts of Velký Malahov.

References

Villages in Domažlice District